Edward William "Dick" Gorsuch (26 November 1878 – 7 August 1934) was an Australian rules footballer who played with Carlton in the Victorian Football League (VFL).

Family
The son of Edward William Gorsuch (-1928), and Louisa Gorsuch (1857-1910), née Holland, Edward William Gorsuch was born in Carlton, Victoria on 26 November 1878.

He married Edith Maud Walton (1878-1962) in 1902. They had two children: Edward William Augustus Roy Gorsuch (1903-1972), Hazel Maud Griffiths, née Gorsuch (1906-1946).

Football
Injured in the pre-season, He only played one game for the Carlton First XVIII: at full-forward, against Melbourne, at the MCG, on 15 July 1899.

In 1901 he was cleared from Carlton to Carlton Juniors.

Death
He died at St Vincent's Hospital, Melbourne on 7 August 1934.

Notes

References

External links 

Dick Gorsuch's profile at Blueseum
 

1878 births
1934 deaths
Australian rules footballers from Melbourne
Carlton Football Club players
People from Carlton, Victoria